Helina reversio is a fly from the genus Helina, in the family Muscidae. It is a common and variable fly.

Biology
Larvae are found in cow dung, rotting tree stumps, old hornet's nests, and moss.

Distribution
North America, Many parts of Europe, Northern Asia as far east as Japan.

See also
 Helina reversio on the Ecology of Commanster Site

References

 

Muscidae
Diptera of Europe
Insects described in 1780
Taxa named by Moses Harris